Paul Arden Willey was a Canadian tennis player.

Willey, the Canadian junior champion in 1949, attended Vancouver's Kitsilano Secondary School.

In 1954 he won the Ontario Championships in singles, and was runner-up at the same event in 1956 to Bob Bédard and in 1957 to Don Fontana, in the latter tournament playing with a sore elbow. In 1956, he defeated Nicola Pietrangeli on red clay at Florence, and in 1957 he defeated Mal Anderson on grass at Southampton. He won several tournaments in British Columbia in the late 1950s.

He played for the Canada Davis Cup team from 1953 to 1958 and had a singles win against American Barry MacKay in 1956. Between 1959 and 1963 he served as Canada's national coach, before relocating to Arizona with wife Colleen.

See also
List of Canada Davis Cup team representatives

References

External links
 
 
 

Year of birth missing
2005 deaths
Canadian male tennis players
Racket sportspeople from British Columbia
Sportspeople from Vancouver
Canadian emigrants to the United States